Mamloo Dam, is a dam in the Central Alborz mountain range of northern Iran near to the Mount Damavand.

Dams in Tehran Province